Bangwe is an administrative ward in Kigoma-Ujiji District of Kigoma Region in Tanzania. 
In 2016 the Tanzania National Bureau of Statistics report there were 17,009 people in the ward, from 15,453 in 2012.

Villages / neighborhoods 
The ward has 8 villages and neighborhoods.

 Buteko
 Kamala Kati
 Kamala Kisiwani
 Kamala Magharibi
 Kamala Mashariki A
 Kamala Mashariki B
 Katonga Magharibi
 Katonga Mashariki

References

Wards of Kigoma Region